Bosko the Doughboy is a one-reel 1931 short subject animated cartoon, part of the Bosko series. It was directed by Hugh Harman, and first released on October 17, 1931 as part of the Looney Tunes series from Harman-Ising Productions and distributed by Warner Bros.

The film score was composed by Frank Marsales.

Plot
The cartoon opens with images of explosions, gunfire, and heavy artillery; one character even fires into the camera. It is World War I, and the ever-cheerful Bosko is a doughboy eating down in a trench. Enemy fire destroys his meal, and later a picture of his girlfriend, Honey. Bosko shows a rare moment of anger, but is quickly cheered up by a fellow soldier. The two begin to dance, only to be interrupted by more gunfire. Bosko finally decides to fight back and downs an enemy bomber (actually a pelican) by using a fellow soldier as a cannon. A friendly hippopotamus is shot down by heavy artillery, which Bosko destroys with a pair of longjohns-turned-catapult. He then saves the wounded soldier by unzipping his navel and retrieving the shell inside. The projectile explodes anyway, turning the already black-faced Bosko even blacker and prompting him to exclaim "Mammy!" à la Al Jolson.

Notes
Bosko the Doughboy is notable for its departure from the standard cartoon formula of its era. Bosko is usually infallibly happy and chipper; Doughboy forces him to drop this demeanor and fight back. Other Bosko shorts concentrate primarily on Bosko cavorting with other characters in a musical wonderland; in Doughboy, Bosko can't dance more than a few seconds before coming under enemy fire. Bosko's cartoons generally have little to no conflict; Doughboy is nothing but fighting. In short, Bosko the Doughboy is almost a total departure from other shorts in the series (and from those of other studios of the time). It is usually regarded as a high point of the character's cartoon career.

Home media
Bosko the Doughboy is available on disc 2 of the Looney Tunes Golden Collection: Volume 6 and on Uncensored Bosko: Vol 1.

References

External links
 
 

1931 films
1931 animated films
1930s war films
Looney Tunes shorts
Warner Bros. Cartoons animated short films
American black-and-white films
Films directed by Hugh Harman
American World War I films
Bosko films
Films scored by Frank Marsales
1930s Warner Bros. animated short films
1930s English-language films